A domain name registrar is a company that manages the reservation of Internet domain names. A domain name registrar must be accredited by a generic top-level domain (gTLD) registry or a country code top-level domain (ccTLD) registry. A registrar operates in accordance with the guidelines of the designated domain name registries.

History
Until 1999, Network Solutions Inc. (NSI) operated the registries for the com, net, and org top-level domains (TLDs). In addition to the function of domain name registry operator, it was also the sole registrar for these domains. However, several companies had developed independent registrar services. In 1996 one such company, Ivan Pope's company, NetNames, developed  the concept of a standalone commercial domain name registration service which would sell domain registration and other associated services to the public, effectively establishing the retail arm of an industry with the registries being the wholesalers. NSI assimilated this model, which ultimately led to the separation of registry and registrar functions.

In 1997, PGMedia filed an antitrust suit against NSI citing the DNS root zone as an essential facility, and the US National Science Foundation (NSF) was joined as a defendant in this action. Ultimately, NSI was granted immunity from antitrust litigation, but the litigation created enough pressure to restructure the domain name market.

In October 1998, following pressure from the growing domain name registration business and other interested parties, NSI's agreement with the United States Department of Commerce was amended. This amendment required the creation of a shared registration system that supported multiple registrars. This system officially commenced service on November 30, 1999 under the supervision of the Internet Corporation for Assigned Names and Numbers (ICANN), although there had been several testbed registrars using the system since March 11, 1999. Since then, over 900 registrars have entered the market for domain name registration services.

Of the registrars who initially entered the market, many have continued to grow and outpace rivals. GoDaddy is the largest registrar. Other widely used registrars include Enom, Tucows, and Webcentral. Registrars who initially led the market but later were surpassed by rivals include Network Solutions and Dotster.

Each ICANN-accredited registrar must pay a fixed fee of US$4,000 plus a variable fee. The sum of variable registrar fees is intended to total US$3.8 million. The competition created by the shared registration system enables end users to choose from many registrars offering a range of related services at varying prices.

Designated registrar
Domain registration information is maintained by the domain name registries, which contract with domain registrars to provide registration services to the public. An end user selects a registrar to provide the registration service, and that registrar becomes the designated registrar for the domain chosen by the user.

Only the designated registrar may modify or delete information about domain names in a central registry database. It is not unusual for an end user to switch registrars, invoking a domain transfer process between the registrars involved, that is governed by specific domain name transfer policies.

When a registrar registers a .com domain name for an end-user, it must pay a maximum annual fee of US$7.85 to VeriSign, the registry operator for com, and a US$0.18 annual administration fee to ICANN. Most domain registrars price their services and products to address both the annual fees and the administration fees that must be paid to ICANN. Barriers to entry into the bulk registrar industry are high for new companies without an existing customer base.

Many registrars also offer registration through reseller affiliates. An end-user registers either directly with a registrar, or indirectly through one or more layers of resellers. As of 2010, the retail cost generally ranges from a low of about $7.50 per year to about $35 per year for a simple domain registration, although registrars often drop the price far lower—sometimes even free—when ordered with other products such as web hosting services.

The maximum period of registration for a domain name is  10 years. Some registrars offer longer periods of up to 100 years, but such offers involve the registrar renewing the registration for their customer; the 100-year registration would not be in the official registration database.

DNS hosting

Registration of a domain name establishes a set of name server records in the DNS servers of the parent domain, indicating the IP addresses of DNS servers that are authoritative for the domain. This provides a reference for direct queries of domain data.

Registration of a domain does not automatically imply the provision of DNS services for the registered domain. Most registrars do offer DNS hosting as an optional free service for domains registered through them.  If DNS services are not offered, or the end-user opts out, the end-user is responsible for procuring or self-hosting DNS services. Registrars require the specification of usually at least two name servers.

DNSSEC support
The Domain Name System Security Extensions (DNSSEC) is a suite of Internet Engineering Task Force (IETF) specifications for securing certain kinds of information provided by the Domain Name System. This involves a registrar processing public key data and creating DS records for addition into the parent zone. All new GTLD registries and registrars must support DNSSEC.

Domain name transfer
A domain name transfer is the process of changing the designated registrar of a domain name. ICANN has defined a Policy on Transfer of Registrations between Registrars. The usual process of a domain name transfer is
 The end user verifies that the whois admin contact info is correct, particularly the email address; obtains the authentication code (EPP or UDAI transfer code) from the old registrar, and removes any domain lock that has been placed on the registration.  If the whois information had been out of date and is now updated, the end-user should wait 12–24 hours before proceeding further, to allow time for the updated data to propagate.
 The end user contacts the new registrar with the wish to transfer the domain name to their service, and supplies the authentication code.
 The gaining Registrar must obtain express authorization from either the Registered Name Holder or the Administrative Contact. A transfer may only proceed if confirmation of the transfer is received by the gaining Registrar from one of these contacts. The authorization must be made via a valid Standardized Form of Authorization, which may be sent e.g. by e-mail to the e-mail addresses listed in the WHOIS. The Registered Name Holder or the Administrative Contact must confirm the transfer. The new registrar starts electronically the transfer of the domain with the help of the authentication code (auth code).
 The old registrar will contact the end user to confirm the authenticity of this request.  The end user may have to take further action with the old registrar, such as returning to the online management tools, to re-iterate their desire to proceed, in order to expedite the transfer.
 The old registrar will release authority to the new registrar.
 The new registrar will notify the end user of transfer completion.  The new registrar may have automatically copied over the domain server information, and everything on the website will continue to work as before.  Otherwise, the domain server information will need to be updated with the new registrar.

After this process, the new registrar is the domain name's designated registrar. The process may take about five days.  In some cases, the old registrar may intentionally delay the transfer as long as allowable.  After transfer, the domain cannot be transferred again for 60 days, except back to the previous registrar.

It is unwise to attempt to transfer a domain immediately before it expires. In some cases, a transfer can take up to 14 days, meaning that the transfer may not complete before the registration expires. This could result in loss of the domain name registration and failure of the transfer.  To avoid this, end users should either transfer well before the expiration date, or renew the registration before attempting the transfer.

If a domain registration expires, irrespective of the reason, it can be difficult, expensive, or impossible for the original owner to get it back.  After the expiration date, the domain status often passes through several management phases, often for a period of months; usually it does not simply become generally available.

Transfer scams

The introduction of a shared registry system opened up the previous domain registration monopoly to new entities known as registrars, which were qualified by ICANN to do business. Many registrars had to compete with each other, and although some companies offered value added services or used viral marketing, others, such as VeriSign and the Domain Registry of America attempted to trick customers to switch from their current registrar using a practice known as domain slamming.

Many of these transfer scams involve a notice sent in the mail, fax, or e-mail. Some scammers contact end-users by telephone (because the contact information is available through WHOIS) to obtain more information. These notices would include information publicly available from the WHOIS database to add to the look of authenticity. The text would include legalese to confuse the end user into thinking that it is an official binding notice. Scam registrars go after domain names that are expiring soon or have recently expired. Domain name expiry dates are readily available via WHOIS.

Drop catcher

A drop catcher is a domain name registrar who offers the service of attempting to quickly register a given domain name for a customer if that name becomes available—that is, to "catch" a "dropped" name—when the domain name's registration expires and is then deleted, either because the registrant abandons the domain or because the registrant did not renew the registration prior to deletion.

Registrar rankings
Several organizations post market-share-ranked lists of domain name registrars and numbers of domains registered at each. The published lists differ in which top-level domains (TLDs) they use; in the frequency of updates; and in whether their basic data is absolute numbers provided by registries, or daily changes derived from Zone files.

The lists appear to all use at most 16 publicly available generic TLDs (gTLDs) that existed as of December 2009, plus .us. A February 2010 ICANN zone file access concept paper explains that most country code TLD (ccTLD) registries stopped providing zone files in 2003, citing abuse.

Published rankings and reports include:

 Monthly (but with approximately a three-month delay), ICANN posts registry reports created by the registries of all gTLDs. These reports list absolute numbers of domains registered with each ICANN-accredited registrar.
 Yearly (but covering only the period from 2002 to 2007), DomainTools.com, operated by Name Intelligence, Inc., published registrar statistics. Totals  included .com, .net, .org, .info, .biz and .us. It cited "daily changes" (presumably from daily zone files) as the basis for its yearly aggregates.

See also
Drop registrar
Private sub-domain registry

References

External links
 List of ICANN accredited registrars

Domain Name System